Kuali, Inc. is a higher education software development company based in Salt Lake City, Utah. The company develops open-source administration software for universities and colleges in collaboration with higher education partner institutions. As of 2014, about 59 institutions were involved in the development of various Kuali products.

The Kuali community consists of universities and colleges cooperating to build open-source, scalable, and service driven tools. Kuali and its community have worked together to build many different tools including Kuali Open Library Environment (OLE), the Kuali Financial System, Kuali Rice, Kuali Research, and Kuali Coeus.

History 
The Kuali community began in 2004. The organization was established to take on the “Kuali Project,” a project aimed at developing a community sourced financial system. The group was founded by the University of Hawaii, Indiana University, rSmart and The National Association of College and University Business Officers (NACUBO) with an initial grant of $2.5 million from Andrew W. Mellon Foundation and funding by the founding members.

In 2005, the Kuali community organized a more formal non-profit organization, the Kuali Foundation. The new organization was created “for higher education, by higher education,” and its member dues-paying institutions rose to 74 by 2014.

In August 2014, the Kuali Foundation announced the launch of its for-profit commercial entity. The company re-licensed and took over development the Kuali community software and began hosting it in the cloud. The software is released to the community under the agpl open source license. The Kuali Foundation still exists as a shareholder in the company.

The Kuali company has taken two rounds of investment, $10 million from Owl Ventures in February 2018 and $12 million from Mercato Partners in December 2019. The funds secured have been used to build additional modules and ramp up sales and marketing.

Products

Kuali Student 
Kuali Student is a set of modules which extend and enhance an institution's student information system. Current modules include Curriculum Management and Catalog Management.

Kuali Research 
Kuali Research is an enterprise software system that addresses the full sponsored projects life cycle. The software handles administrative processes for pre- and post-award tasks. It was created by academic researchers, in keeping with Kuali’s “by and for higher education” slogan. It can be used by OPR staffs, investigators and others for collaboration of research.

The application was created through the collaborative effort of multiple higher education institutions, including the University of Maryland, Indiana University, University of Toronto, Boston College, University of Washington and North-West University.

Kuali Financial System 
Kuali Financials can be used for business transactions, budget management, purchasing, payments and reimbursement, capital asset management, labor distribution and many other financial functions. KFS improves accountability by providing an online history of all transactions and related administrative services.

Kuali Ready 
Kuali Ready provides a framework for Continuity Planning. Ready can help higher ed institutions mitigate and/or recover from unexpected disruptions until normal business operations can be restored. Kuali Ready was originally developed by the University of California Berkeley.

Kuali Build 
Kuali Build is a no-code tool that end-users can use to create forms and approval workflows in a safe, secure and centrally managed way.

References

External links 
 

Companies based in Utah
Free educational software
Learning management systems
2004 establishments in Utah